Jerry Michael Glanville (born October 14, 1941) is an American football coach who was most recently the head coach of the Alabama Airborne of Major League Football (MLFB). He played football at Northern Michigan University in the early 1960s, and is a former NASCAR driver and owner, and sportscaster. He served as head coach of the Houston Oilers from 1986 to 1990 and the Atlanta Falcons from 1990 to 1994, compiling a career National Football League (NFL) record of 63–73. From 2007 to 2009, he was the Head Football Coach at Portland State University, tallying a mark of 9–24. Glanville has worked as an analyst on HBO's Inside the NFL, CBS's The NFL Today/NFL on CBS and Fox's coverage of the NFL. He has also raced on the Automobile Racing Club of America circuit. Glanville also briefly served as a consultant and liaison for the United Football League in 2011.

While head coach of the Houston Oilers, Glanville coined the now-famous phrase "NFL means 'not for long'", while admonishing NFL back judge Jim Daopoulos for making what Glanville felt were bad calls. The exact quote is "This isn't college, you're not at a homecoming. This is N-F-L, which stands for 'not for long' when you make them fuckin' calls." The "NFL" line was in reference to the fact that Daopoulos was in his first year in the league, having previously worked in college football.

Playing career
Jerry Glanville grew up in Perrysburg, Ohio and played football for Perrysburg High School, graduating in 1959. He went on to play college football as a middle linebacker at Northern Michigan University, graduating in 1964 with a bachelor's degree. He also holds a master's degree from Western Kentucky University, where he worked as an assistant football coach on campus and roomed with fellow former NFL coach Joe Bugel. The two were known for drawing football plays on pizza boxes.

Coaching career

National Football League
During Glanville's time in the National Football League he was the special teams/defensive assistant for the Detroit Lions from 1974 to 1976, the secondary coach for the Atlanta Falcons from 1977 to 1978 and the Falcons defensive coordinator from 1979 to 1982, the secondary coach of the Buffalo Bills in 1983, the defensive coordinator of the then Houston Oilers from 1984 to 1985 and then head coach from 1985 to 1989 (initially being the interim coach after the firing of Hugh Campbell, and then being the permanent replacement starting in 1986), and head coach of the Atlanta Falcons from 1990 to 1993.

Houston Oilers
As head coach of the Oilers from 1985 to 1989, Glanville was famous for often leaving tickets at will-call for Elvis Presley (who by that point had been dead for over a decade), wearing all black to be easily recognized by his players, and driving replicas of vehicles driven by actor James Dean. Glanville's Oilers were an aggressive, hard-hitting team (to the point of resorting to cheap shots in the eyes of their opponents). During his tenure, the Astrodome was nicknamed "The House of Pain" due to both the Oilers' hard-hitting style and the often painfully high decibel levels which were typical of Oilers home games. Glanville often feuded with the head coaches of Houston's AFC Central rivals, Sam Wyche of the Cincinnati Bengals and Marty Schottenheimer of the Cleveland Browns. He received a highly publicized post-game dressing down from Pittsburgh Steelers head coach Chuck Noll during the customary postgame handshake after the Oilers defeated the Steelers in the Houston Astrodome during the 1987 season.

Glanville turned the Oilers, a team that had struggled through most of the 1980s, into an aggressive, hard-hitting group that preached a "hit the beach" mentality, and he made players such as future Hall of Fame quarterback Warren Moon into household names (incidentally, Glanville and Moon didn't get along, as evidenced by Glanville's constant reference to Moon as "our quarterback" in his book Elvis Don't Like Football: The Life and Raucous Times of the NFL's Most Outspoken Coach when discussing his tenure as Oilers' coach.) During Glanville's tenure, the Oilers made three playoff appearances (which happened to be during his last three seasons), twice playing in the AFC divisional round.  His final game with the Oilers was the 1989 AFC wild card game, played on December 31, 1989.  Glanville's 1989 squad finished its season with consecutive losses against the Bengals in Cincinnati (61–7), at home against the Cleveland Browns in the final seconds in a game that decided the AFC Central title (24–20), and at home in the playoffs against the Steelers (26–23 in overtime). Had the Oilers defeated Pittsburgh, Glanville would have spent January 6, 1990, preparing the team to play at Denver and, possibly, play for its first AFC Championship Game berth in a decade. Instead, Glanville was fired that day. To replace him, Oilers owner K. S. "Bud" Adams hired University of Houston head coach and former Redskins and Bears head coach Jack Pardee.

Atlanta Falcons
Roughly one week after his firing by the Oilers, Glanville was hired to become the head coach of the Atlanta Falcons (1990–1993).  He had been a defensive coordinator for the Falcons, best known for developing the famous "Gritz Blitz" defense that featured rushing multiple players on the defensive side of the football against opposing offenses.  The brash Glanville, as well as fan favorites such as cornerback/return specialist Deion Sanders, generated a great deal of excitement in Atlanta.  A perfect preseason in 1990 raised expectations prior to the first game of the season, against Glanville's former team, the Oilers. The host Falcons withstood a furious rally and scored on a late pick-six by Sanders.  Atlanta defeated the Oilers, 47–27.

Glanville claimed with Atlanta he inherited a "flat-tire," but would take the team to the playoffs in the 1991 season, ending a nine-year playoff drought. Season highlights included a season sweep of the division rival 49ers, which cost San Francisco a playoff spot despite both teams finishing 10–6; and the Falcons' first playoff victory since 1978 and only the second playoff win in the franchise's 26-year history.  The season ended with a loss to the eventual Super Bowl champion Washington Redskins in the divisional round. During his time with the Falcons, the team would pitch a "Back in Black" motto with new all-black uniforms and the same aggressive type play on defense, an offensive system known as the "Red Gun" that would implement most of the principles associated with the Run-N-Shoot offense, and an emphasis on special teams as he had done in Houston. The Falcons featured talented players such as future Hall of Fame CB "Prime Time" Deion Sanders and were known for unorthodox antics. Expectations were high after the success of the 1991 season and after the Falcons vacated Atlanta–Fulton County Stadium for the Georgia Dome, but the team's consecutive 6–10 records for 1992 and 1993 led the Falcons to dismiss Glanville in early 1994. He was out of football until he became the University of Hawaii's defensive coordinator over a decade later. His career record as an NFL head coach is 63–73.

Glanville vehemently opposed Falcons general manager Ken Herock's selection of Brett Favre in the second round of the 1991 NFL Draft, citing Favre's personal issues with alcohol and his party lifestyle. He said it would take a plane crash for him to put Favre into a game. Glanville also was known to place $100 bets before games (with Favre and others) on whether Favre could throw a football into the third deck of stadiums or not. Favre only threw four passes during his one season with Atlanta, then was traded to the Green Bay Packers in the 1992 off-season for a first-round draft pick. Glanville claimed the trade was a wake-up call for Favre, who was known for even being late to the team picture during his rookie season with the Falcons. Favre went on to play 19 seasons in the NFL, starting every game from September 20, 1992 to December 5, 2010 and becoming the first NFL player to win three AP MVP awards, as well as the first player to throw for 70,000 passing yards and 500 touchdowns. He would also appear in two Super Bowls, winning Super Bowl XXXI.

United Football League
On March 21, 2011, the Hartford Colonials of the United Football League announced that Glanville would serve as the team's head coach and general manager. The Colonials suspended operations in August of that year; Glanville would remain with the league as a consultant, color commentator for the league's television broadcasts, and liaison for potential expansion markets. Glanville left the league after one season.

College football

Glanville was formerly the defensive coordinator for the University of Hawaii's football team, working under his former offensive coordinator (and eventual successor) at Atlanta, June Jones, for two seasons. Prior to his tenure at the University of Hawaii, Glanville's earlier involvement with college football was the defensive ends/outside linebackers coach at Georgia Tech from 1968 to 1973 and the defensive coordinator at Western Kentucky University in 1967, shortly after his own career as a player had ended.

On February 28, 2007, Glanville accepted the head coaching position at Portland State University (PSU), his first college head coaching job. Glanville, who replaced Tim Walsh, was the program's 12th head coach in their history.  He resigned this position with the support of the university on November 17, 2009, with an overall record of 9–24 during his tenure.

Return to coaching
On February 23, 2018, Glanville was named defensive coordinator for the Hamilton Tiger-Cats of the Canadian Football League (CFL). He left the team after the 2018 season for personal reasons.

In 2019, he was hired by Marc Trestman as the defensive coordinator for the Tampa Bay Vipers of the XFL. Glanville was named head coach of the Conquerors of The Spring League on October 15, 2020.

Racing career
Glanville began racing by learning from seven-time Winston Cup Series champion Dale Earnhardt, who would mentor Glanville in tests at Richmond International Raceway. Glanville officially started his racing career in the NASCAR Busch Grand National Series in 1992 for Lewis Cooper with sponsorship from the Falcons. After failing to qualify in his first career attempt at Lanier Speedway, he made his series debut at Orange County Speedway, finishing 22nd. He ran six races during his three-year timespan in the series, with a best finish of 20th at Volusia County Speedway in 1992. Glanville returned to the series in 1999, but failed to qualify for all five races he attempted.

He later ran in the ARCA Hooters SuperCar Series, running ten races in 1994 as an owner/driver of the No. 81, and recorded a best finish of ninth at I-70 Speedway. Glanville returned to ARCA in 2000, running a part-time schedule until 2004 for his and Norm Benning's teams, his best finish being fourth at Nashville Superspeedway in 2002.

In 1995, he participated in the Skoal Bandit Copper World Classic, the inaugural SuperTruck Series race, and finished 27th. He continued racing in the Truck Series from 1995 to 1999, with a best finish of 14th three times.

In addition to the Busch and Truck Series, Glanville competed in the NASCAR Slim Jim All Pro Series in 1996, finishing 23rd at Gresham Motorsports Park. He later raced in the Winston West Series, his debut coming in 1997 at Pikes Peak International Raceway, where he finished seventh. From 1997 to 1999, he ran eight races in the Hooters Pro Cup, with a best finish of 12th at Southampton Speedway.

Glanville was also working for CBS Sports during this period, mainly as an NFL studio analyst. Glanville also called several NASCAR Craftsman Truck Series races on CBS/TNN during this period, mainly as a race analyst in the booth.

In media
The Sega Genesis system offered Jerry Glanville's PigSkin Footbrawl, a medieval-themed arcade-style football game. The game was a port of the 1990 classic arcade game Pigskin 621 A.D., released by Bally Midway. Glanville provided soundbites for the game.

Head coaching record

National Football League

College

Motorsports career results

NASCAR
(key) (Bold – Pole position awarded by qualifying time. Italics – Pole position earned by points standings or practice time. * – Most laps led.)

Busch Series

Craftsman Truck Series

ARCA Re/Max Series
(key) (Bold – Pole position awarded by qualifying time. Italics – Pole position earned by points standings or practice time. * – Most laps led.)

References

External links

Portland State profile
 
 

1941 births
Living people
American football linebackers
College football announcers
ARCA Menards Series drivers
Atlanta Falcons coaches
Atlanta Falcons head coaches
Buffalo Bills coaches
Detroit Lions coaches
Georgia Tech Yellow Jackets football coaches
Hamilton Tiger-Cats coaches
Hartford Colonials coaches
Hawaii Rainbow Warriors football coaches
Houston Oilers coaches
Houston Oilers head coaches
NASCAR drivers
NASCAR team owners
National Football League announcers
National Football League defensive coordinators
NFL Europe broadcasters
Northern Michigan Wildcats football coaches
Northern Michigan Wildcats football players
Portland State Vikings football coaches
Tampa Bay Vipers coaches
The Spring League coaches
United Football League (2009–2012) head coaches
United Football League broadcasters
Western Kentucky Hilltoppers football coaches
Sportspeople from Detroit
People from Perrysburg, Ohio
Racing drivers from Michigan
Racing drivers from Ohio